Buwama is a town in the Buganda Region of Uganda.

Location

The coordinates of Buwama are 0°03'48.0"N, 32°06'23.0"E
(Latitude:0.063333; Longitude:32.106389).

Overview
Buwama is a growing urban centre along the Masaka Highway, just north of the Equator. The town is connected to the national electricity grid. The town has access to potable piped water following improvements between 2011 and 2017, funded with loans from the African Development Bank.

Other facilities available include three farmers markets, a soccer stadium (Archbishop Kasujja Stadium), a police station and a magistrate's court. Also present are two petrol stations, a radio station (103.3 Buwama FM) and a number of schools. Buwama Health Centre III, a public healthcare facility offers healthcare services to the public.

Population
The population of Buwama was estimated at about 16,000 people, as of June 2017.

Challenges
As of June 2017, the town had two major changes. The first was the town's inability to dispose of garbage in a sustainable, healthy, environmentally friendly manner.

See also
 List of cities and towns in Uganda

References

External links
Parishes in Buwama Subcounty

Populated places in Central Region, Uganda
Cities in the Great Rift Valley
Mpigi District